Richard Krajicek and Jan Siemerink were the defending champions, but Krajicek did not participate this year.  Siemerink partnered Daniel Vacek, losing in the semifinals.

Jacco Eltingh and Paul Haarhuis won the title, defeating Mark Knowles and Jared Palmer 7–6, 7–6 in the final.

Seeds

Draw

Finals

Top half

Section 1

Section 2

Bottom half

Section 3

Section 4

References

 Main Draw

Men's Doubles